The 2008 Seattle Mariners season was the 32nd Major League Baseball season in the team's history. Coming off the heels of the previous 2007 season, in which the M's finished with their first winning record since 2003, the team was widely expected to once again compete for the American League West division championship. The team was bolstered by some major roster additions during the previous offseason, most notably starting pitchers Érik Bédard and Carlos Silva. However, by the end of May, it became apparent that the team had gone back to its losing ways of the 2004–06 seasons. Despite their losing ways, they won their first and last game of the season. Their longest winning-streak of the season is 4 games after a Cleveland sweep at the end of August and a 12-6 win against the Texas Rangers on the first day of September. However, standing at 57-87, their longest losing-streak of the season is 12 games, 11 on the road, 1 at home, after being swept by the L.A. Angels, Kansas City Royals, Oakland Athletics, and suffering a loss at the last homestand opener against the L.A. Angels. On September 23, the Mariners became the first club to spend $100 million in payroll and lose 100 games. The team finished the season with a  record, last in the West for the 4th time in 5 years, and second worst in the majors.

With the team underperforming and underachieving, a number of people who had become scapegoats for the team's underperformance were dismissed during the season, most notably general manager Bill Bavasi, field manager John McLaren, first baseman Richie Sexson, and designated hitter José Vidro.

Offseason
December 20, 2007: Signed free agent RHP Carlos Silva
January 8, 2008: Signed free agent INF Miguel Cairo
January 31, 2008: Signed free agent OF Brad Wilkerson
February 8, 2008: Traded OF Adam Jones, LHP George Sherrill, and minor league pitchers Tony Butler, Chris Tillman and Kam Mickolio to the Baltimore Orioles for LHP Érik Bédard
Dismissed all coaches hired under Mike Hargrove except hitting coach Jeff Pentland and hired former MLB managers Jim Riggleman (bench coach), Sam Perlozzo (third base coach), and Lee Elia (special assistant to the manager), as well as Mel Stottlemyre (pitching coach), Norm Charlton (bullpen coach), and Eddie Rodriguez (first base coach).

Regular season

Season standings

Record vs. opponents

Roster

In-season transactions
 April 2, 2008: Placed pitcher J. J. Putz on the 15-day disabled list, and purchased the contract of pitcher Roy Corcoran from Tacoma of the Pacific Coast League (AAA).
 April 11, 2008: Recalled IF Greg Norton from Triple-A Tacoma; designated OF Charlton Jimerson for assignment.
 April 14, 2008: Selected the contract of LHP Arthur Rhodes from Double-A West Tenn Diamond Jaxx; Recalled RHP R. A. Dickey from Triple-A Tacoma; Placed OF Mike Morse on 15-day disabled list with a dislocated left shoulder; Optioned LHP Eric O'Flaherty to Double-A West Tenn Diamond Jaxx.
 April 15, 2008: Placed LHP Érik Bédard on the 15-day disabled list, retroactive to April 9, with inflammation in his left hip.
 April 16, 2008: Recalled RHP Brandon Morrow from Double-A West Tenn Diamond Jaxx; Re-signed OF Charlton Jimerson to a Minor League contract, he had been designated for assignment on April 10.
 April 22, 2008: Activated RHP J. J. Putz from the 15-day disabled list; optioned RHP R. A. Dickey to Triple-A Tacoma.
 April 25, 2008: Signed C Kenji Johjima to a 3-year, $24 million contract extension through 2011.
 April 26, 2008: Activated LHP Érik Bédard from the 15-day disabled list; optioned RHP Roy Corcoran to Triple-A Tacoma.
 April 30, 2008: Recalled C Jeff Clement and OF Wladimir Balentien from Triple-A Tacoma; Designated INF Greg Norton and OF Brad Wilkerson for assignment.
May 5, 2008: Traded Greg Norton to the Atlanta Braves for a player to be named or cash considerations; Released nonroster OF Bronson Sardinha.
May 7, 2008: Released OF Brad Wilkerson, he had been designated for assignment on April 30.
May 18, 2008: Optioned C Jeff Clement to Triple-A Tacoma.
May 19, 2008: Recalled OF Jeremy Reed from Triple-A Tacoma; claimed RHP Tracy Thorpe off waivers from Toronto.
May 21, 2008: Designated RHP Cha Seung Baek for assignment.
May 22, 2008: Recalled RHP R. A. Dickey from Triple-A Tacoma.
May 27, 2008: Acquired RHP Jared Wells from the San Diego Padres for RHP Cha Seung Baek.
May 28, 2008: Optioned RHP Jared Wells to Triple-A Tacoma; Activated RHP Anderson Garcia from the 15-day disabled list and optioned him to Single-A High Desert.
June 13, 2008: Placed RHP J. J. Putz on the 15-day disabled list with a hyper-extended right elbow; Recalled RHP Roy Corcoran from Triple-A Tacoma.
June 16, 2008: Recalled C Jeff Clement from Triple-A Tacoma; Optioned OF Wladimir Balentien to Triple-A Tacoma.
June 24, 2008: Acquired LHP Nelson Payano from the Atlanta Braves to complete the May 5 trade.
July 1, 2008: Placed RHP Félix Hernández on the 15-day disabled list with a sprained left ankle retroactive to June 24; Recalled LHP Cesar Jimenez from Triple-A Tacoma.
July 7, 2008: Released RHP Anderson Garcia.
July 10, 2008: Recalled RHP Jared Wells from Triple-A Tacoma; Selected the contract of INF Tug Hulett from Triple-A Tacoma; Placed LHP Érik Bédard on the 15-day disabled list, retroactive to July 5, with stiffness in his left shoulder; Released INF Richie Sexson.
July 11, 2008: Activated RHP Félix Hernández from the 15-day disabled list; Optioned RHP Jared Wells to Triple-A Tacoma.
July 17, 2008: Optioned INF Tug Hulett to Triple-A Tacoma; Signed OF Julio Morban and RHP Francisco Valdivia.
July 18, 2008: Recalled 1B Bryan LaHair from Triple-A Tacoma.
July 20, 2008: Activated RHP J. J. Putz from the 15-day disabled list; Optioned LHP Ryan Rowland-Smith to Triple-A Tacoma.
July 25, 2008: Signed RHP Jorge Sosa to a minor league contract.
July 30, 2008: Claimed RHP Luis Munoz off waivers from Pittsburgh and optioned him to Double-A West Tenn.
July 31, 2008: Acquired RHP Gaby Hernandez from the Florida Marlins in exchange for LHP Arthur Rhodes.
August 13, 2008: Released DH/INF José Vidro (Designated for assignment on August 5)

Front office/coaching staff
 June 9, 2008: Dismissed hitting coach Jeff Pentland and named special assistant Lee Elia as his replacement
 June 16, 2008: Dismissed general manager Bill Bavasi and named vice president/assistant GM Lee Pelekoudas as interim GM
 June 19, 2008: Dismissed field manager John McLaren and named bench coach Jim Riggleman as interim manager. Elia promoted to bench coach and minor league hitting instructor Jose Castro promoted to hitting coach.

Individual accomplishments
 May 18: OF Ichiro Suzuki breaks the franchise stolen base record of 290 previously held by Julio Cruz in a game against the San Diego Padres
June 17: RHP Félix Hernández throws an immaculate inning (retiring all three batters via strikeout using the minimum nine pitches needed to do so) against the Florida Marlins, becoming the thirteenth American League pitcher to do so
 June 23: Félix Hernández hits a grand slam off New York Mets pitcher (and fellow Venezuelan) Johan Santana, becoming the first pitcher in franchise history to hit a home run, as well as the first American League pitcher to hit a grand slam in modern Interleague play
 July 6: C Jamie Burke pitched in the 15th inning of a game against the Detroit Tigers after catching the previous six innings. Burke, who had made four relief appearances in the minor leagues, was saddled with a loss and became the first position player to receive a decision as a pitcher since 2000.
 July 15: Ichiro Suzuki plays in his eighth consecutive Major League Baseball All-Star Game
 July 29: Ichiro Suzuki records his 3,000th major-league hit (1,278 in Nippon Professional Baseball and 1,722 in MLB) in a game against the Texas Rangers
 September 1: 3B Adrián Beltré hit for the cycle against the Texas Rangers, becoming the fourth Mariner to accomplish the feat. Beltre's cycle came hours after Arizona Diamondbacks shortstop Stephen Drew hit for the cycle in a game against the St. Louis Cardinals, marking the first time two players hit for the cycle in the same day since 1920.
 September 18: Ichiro Suzuki records his 200th hit of the season, completing 8 straight seasons of accomplishing the feat, tying the record for number of 200+ hit consecutive seasons. Hall of Famer Willie Keeler is the only other person to have achieved this milestone, from 1894 through 1901.

Game log

|- align="center" bgcolor="#bbffbb"
| 1 || March 31 || Rangers || 5 – 2 || Green (1-0) || Millwood (0-1) || Putz (1) || 46,334 || 1-0
|- align="center" bgcolor="#ffbbbb"
| 2 || April 1 || Rangers || 5 – 4 || Benoit (1-0) || Putz (0-1) || Wilson (1) || 25,204 || 1-1
|- align="center" bgcolor="#bbffbb" 
| 3 || April 2 || Rangers || 4 – 1 || Silva (1-0) || Jennings (0-1) || Batista (1) || 21,349 || 2-1
|- align="center" bgcolor="ffbbbb"
| 4 || April 4 || @ Orioles || 7 – 4 || Trachsel (1-0) || Washburn (0-1) || Sherrill (2) || 14,429 || 2-2
|- align="center" bgcolor="ffbbbb"
| 5 || April 5 || @ Orioles || 6 – 4 || Albers (1-0) || Batista (0-1) || Sherrill (3) || 24,824 || 2-3
|- align="center" bgcolor="ffbbbb"
| 6 || April 6 || @ Orioles || 3 – 2 || Sarfate (1-0) || Lowe (0-1) || || 19,215 || 2-4
|- align="center" bgcolor="ffbbbb"
| 7 || April 7 || @ Orioles || 5 – 4 || Sarfate (2-0) || O'Flaherty (0-1) || Sherrill (4) || 10,774 || 2-5
|- align="center" bgcolor="#bbffbb"
| 8 || April 8 || @ Rays || 6 – 5 || Bédard (1-0) || Glover (0-1) || Rowland-Smith (1) || 36,048 || 3-5
|- align="center" bgcolor="#bbffbb"
| 9 || April 9 || @ Rays || 7 – 1 || Washburn (1-1) || Sonnanstine || || 12,106 || 4-5
|- align="center" bgcolor="ffbbbb"
| 10 || April 10 || @ Rays || 7 – 0 || Jackson (2-0) || Batista (0-2) || || 11,898 || 4-6
|- align="center" bgcolor="#bbffbb"
| 11 || April 11 || Angels || 8 – 5 || Hernández (1-0) || Weaver (1-2) || Lowe (1) || 28,915 || 5-6
|- align="center" bgcolor="#bbffbb"
| 12 || April 12 || Angels || 8 – 3 || Silva (2-0) || Garland (1-2) || || 34,963 || 6-6
|- align="center" bgcolor="ffbbbb"
| 13 || April 13 || Angels || 10 – 5 || Saunders (2-0) || Baek (0-1) || || 30,664 || 6-7
|- align="center" bgcolor="ffbbbb"
| 14 || April 14 || Royals || 5 – 1 || Greinke (3-0) || Washburn (1-2) || || 16,751 || 6-8
|- align="center" bgcolor="#bbffbb"
| 15 || April 15 || Royals || 11 – 6 || Batista (1-2) || Bale (0-3) || || 17,137 || 7-8
|- align="center" bgcolor="#bbffbb"
| 16 || April 16 || @ Athletics || 4 – 2 || Hernández (2-0) || Blanton (1-3) || || 21,126 || 8-8
|- align="center" bgcolor="#bbffbb"
| 17 || April 17 || @ Athletics || 8 – 1 || Silva (3-0) || DiNardo (1-1) || || 10,164 || 9-8
|- align="center" bgcolor="ffbbbb"
| 18 || April 18 || @ Angels || 5 – 4 || Saunders (3-0) || Dickey (0-1) || Rodríguez (7) || 43,939 || 9-9
|- align="center" bgcolor="ffbbbb"
| 19 || April 19 || @ Angels || 4 – 1 || Santana (3-0) || Washburn (1-2) || Shields (1) || 43,959 || 9-10
|- align="center" bgcolor="bbffbb"
| 20 || April 20 || @ Angels || 4 – 2 || Batista (2-2) || Moseley (1-2) || Rowland-Smith (2) || 43,631 || 10-10
|- align="center" bgcolor="bbffbb"
| 21 || April 22 || Orioles || 4 – 2 || Rhodes (1-0) || Guthrie (0-2) || Putz (2) || 17,780 || 11-10
|- align="center" bgcolor="ffbbbb"
| 22 || April 23 || Orioles || 3 – 2 || Cabrera (2-0) || Rowland-Smith (0-1) || Sherrill (7) || 16,823 || 11-11
|- align="center" bgcolor="ffbbbb"
| 23 || April 24 || Orioles || 8 – 7 || Bradford (2-1) || Green (1-1) || Sherrill (8) || 16,727 || 11-12
|- align="center" bgcolor="ffbbbb"
| 24 || April 25 || Athletics || 4 – 3 || Eveland (3-1) || Batista (2-3) || Street (7) || 40,845 || 11-13
|- align="center" bgcolor="bbffbb"
| 25 || April 26 || Athletics || 5 – 3 || Bédard (2-0) || Duchscherer (1-1) || || 37,563 || 12-13
|- align="center" bgcolor="ffbbbb"
| 26 || April 27 || Athletics || 4 – 2 || Blanton (2-4) || Hernández (2-1) || Street (8) || 32,612 || 12-14
|- align="center" bgcolor="bbffbb"
| 27 || April 29 || @ Indians || 7 – 2 || Lowe (1-1) || Betancourt (1-1) || || 13,827 || 13-14
|- align="center" bgcolor="ffbbbb"
| 28 || April 30 || @ Indians || 8 – 3 || Lee (5-0)  || Washburn (1-4) || || 15,279 || 13-15
|-

|- align="center" bgcolor="ffbbbb"
| 29 || May 1 || @ Indians || 3 – 2 (11)|| Kobayashi (2-0) || Green (1-2) || || 15,722 || 13-16
|- align="center" bgcolor="ffbbbb"
| 30 || May 2 || @ Yankees || 5 – 1 || Wang (6-0) || Bedard (2-1) || || 52,199 || 13-17
|- align="center" bgcolor="ffbbbb"
| 31 || May 3 || @ Yankees || 6 – 1 || Mussina (4-3) || Hernández (2-2) ||  || 52,180 || 13-18
|- align="center" bgcolor="ffbbbb"
| 32 || May 4 || @ Yankees || 8 – 2 || Rasner (1-0) || Silva (3-1) || || 53,542 || 13-19
|- align="center" bgcolor="bbffbb"
| 33 || May 5 || Rangers || 7 – 3 || Washburn (2-4) || Millwood (2-3) || || 16,637 || 14-19
|- align="center" bgcolor="ffbbbb"
| 34 || May 6 || Rangers || 10 – 1 || Ponson (2-0) || Batista (2-4) || || 15,818 || 14-20
|- align="center" bgcolor="ffbbbb"
| 35 || May 7 || Rangers || 2 – 0 || Padilla (5-2) || Bedard (2-2) || Wilson (8) || 17,173 || 14-21
|- align="center" bgcolor="ffbbbb"
| 36 || May 8 || Rangers || 5 – 0 || Germán (1-0) || Hernández (2-3) || || 22,922 || 14-22
|- align="center" bgcolor="ffbbbb"
| 37 || May 9 || White Sox || 4 – 2 || Contreras (3-3) || Silva (3-2) || Jenks (7) || 27,169 || 14-23
|- align="center" bgcolor="ffbbbb"
| 38 || May 10 || White Sox || 8 – 4 || Vázquez (4-3) || Washburn (2-5) || || 33,078 || 14-24
|- align="center" bgcolor="bbffbb"
| 39 || May 11 || White Sox || 6 – 3 ||Batista (3-4) || Floyd (3-2)|| Putz (3) || 30,346 || 15-24
|- align="center" bgcolor="ffbbbb"
| 40 || May 12 || @ Rangers || 13 – 12 (10) || Mathis (1-0) || Morrow (0-1) || || 18,509 || 15-25
|- align="center" bgcolor="ffbbbb"
| 41 || May 13 || @ Rangers || 5 – 2 || Rupe (2-1) || Hernández (2-4) || Guardado (1) || 15,766 || 15-26
|- align="center" bgcolor="bbffbb"
| 42 || May 14 || @ Rangers || 4 – 3 (12) || Putz (1-1) || German (1-2) || Washburn (1) || 22,934 || 16-26
|- align="center" bgcolor="ffbbbb"
| 43 || May 16 || Padres || 6 – 4 || Young (4-3) || Batista (3-5) || Hoffman (8) || 35,586 || 16-27
|- align="center" bgcolor="bbffbb"
| 44 || May 17 || Padres || 4 – 2 || Bédard (3-2) || Wolf (2-4) || Putz (4) || 32,290 || 17-27
|- align="center" bgcolor="bbffbb"
| 45 || May 18 || Padres || 3 – 2 || Rhodes (2-0) || Bell (0-3) || Putz (5) || 35,483 || 18-27
|- align="center" bgcolor="ffbbbb"
| 46 || May 20 || @ Tigers || 12 – 8 || Verlander (2-7) || Silva (3-3) || Jones (7) || 39,463 || 18-28
|- align="center" bgcolor="ffbbbb"
| 47 || May 21 || @ Tigers || 9 – 4 || Rogers (4-4) || Washburn (2-6) || || 36,495 || 18-29
|- align="center" bgcolor="ffbbbb"
| 48 || May 22 || @ Tigers || 9 – 2 || Bonderman (3-4) || Batista (3-6) || Dolsi (1)|| 40,166 || 18-30
|- align="center" bgcolor="ffbbbb"
| 49 || May 23 || @ Yankees || 13 – 2 || Pettitte (4-5)|| Bédard (3-3) || || 52,005 || 18-31
|- align="center" bgcolor="ffbbbb"
| 50 || May 24 || @ Yankees || 12 – 6 || Mussina (7-4) || Silva (3-4) || || 53,512 || 18-32
|- align="center" bgcolor="ffbbbb"
| 51 || May 25 || @ Yankees || 6 – 5 || Ramírez (1-0) || Putz (1-2)|| Rivera (12) || 54,269 || 18-33
|- align="center" bgcolor="ffbbbb" 
| 52 || May 26 || Red Sox || 5 – 3 || Colón (2-0) || Hernández (2-5) || || 35,818 || 18-34
|- align="center" bgcolor="bbffbb"
| 53 || May 27 || Red Sox || 4 – 3 || Putz (2-3) || Timlin (2-3) || || 30,758 || 19-34
|- align="center" bgcolor="bbffbb"
| 54 || May 28 || Red Sox || 1 – 0 || Bédard (4-3) || Wakefield (3-4) || Putz (6) || 30,752 || 20-34
|- align="center" bgcolor="ffbbbb"  
| 55 || May 30 || Tigers || 7 – 4 || Robertson (3-5) || Silva (3-5) || Jones (8) || 34,019 || 20-35
|- align="center" bgcolor="bbffbb"
| 56 || May 31 || Tigers || 5 – 0 || Hernández (3-5) || Verlander  (2=8) || || 33,441 || 21-35
|-

|- align="center" bgcolor="ffbbbb" 
| 57 || June 1 || Tigers || 7 – 5 || Miner (2-3) || Putz (2-3) || || 38,610 || 21-36
|- align="center" bgcolor="ffbbbb"
| 58 || June 2 || Angels || 4 – 2 ||Santana (8-2) ||Washburn (2-7) || Rodríguez (22) || 22,110  || 21-37
|- align="center" bgcolor="ffbbbb"
| 59 || June 3 || Angels || 5 – 4 ||Saunders (9-2) ||Bédard (4-4) || Rodríguez (23) || 23,534 ||21-38
|- align="center" bgcolor="ffbbbb"
| 60 || June 4 || Angels || 5 – 4 ||Weaver (5-6) ||Silva (3-6) || Rodríguez (24) || 32,774 ||21-39
|- align="center" bgcolor="bbffbb"
| 61 || June 6 || @ Red Sox || 8 – 0 ||Hernández (4-5) ||Colón (3-1) || || 37,757 ||22-39
|- align="center" bgcolor="ffbbbb"
| 62 || June 7 || @ Red Sox || 11 – 3 ||Wakefield (4-4) ||Batista (3-7) || || 37,443 ||22-40
|- align="center" bgcolor="ffbbbb"
| 63 || June 8 || @ Red Sox || 2 – 1 ||Masterson (3-0) ||Green (1-2) || Papelbon (18) || 37,198 ||22-41
|- align="center" bgcolor="bbffbb"
| 64 || June 9 || @ Blue Jays || 3 – 2 (10)||Dickey (1-1) ||Frasor (1-1) || Putz (7) || 20,073 ||23-41
|- align="center" bgcolor="ffbbbb"
| 65 || June 10 || @ Blue Jays || 3 – 1  ||McGowan (5-4) ||Silva (3-7) || || 36,170 ||23-42
|- align="center" bgcolor="bbffbb"
| 66 || June 11 || @ Blue Jays || 2 – 1 ||Hernández (5-5) ||Ryan (1-3) || Morrow (1) || 35,702 ||24-42
|- align="center" bgcolor="ffbbbb"
| 67 || June 13 || Nationals ||7 – 6 ||Hill (1-3) || Dickey (1-2)|| Rauch (14) || 35,941 ||24-43
|- align="center" bgcolor="ffbbbb" 
| 68 || June 14 || Nationals ||5 – 2 ||Clippard (1-1) ||Batista (3-8) || Rauch (15) || 32,145 ||24-44
|- align="center" bgcolor="ffbbbb" 
| 69 || June 15 || Nationals ||6 – 2 ||Colomé (2-1) ||Lowe (1-3)|| || 38,548 ||24-45
|- align="center" bgcolor="ffbbbb"
| 70 || June 16 || Marlins ||6 – 1 ||Miller (5-5) ||Silva (3-8) || || 21,609 ||24-46
|- align="center"  bgcolor="bbffbb"
| 71 || June 17 || Marlins ||5 – 4 ||Hernández (6-5) ||Olsen (4-4) || Morrow (2) || 20,214 ||25-46
|- align="center" bgcolor="ffbbbb"
| 72 || June 18 || Marlins ||8 – 3 ||Tucker (2-1) || Dickey (1-3) || || 24,163 ||25-47
|- align="center"  bgcolor="bbffbb"
| 73 || June 20 || @ Braves || 10 – 2 || Rowland-Smith (1-1) || Campillo (2-2) || || 40,268 ||26-47
|- align="center" bgcolor="ffbbbb"
| 74 || June 21 || @ Braves || 5 – 4 || Boyer (2-5) || Batista (3-9) || || 47,158 ||26-48
|- align="center" bgcolor="ffbbbb"
| 75 || June 22 || @ Braves ||8 – 3 ||Hudson (8-5) || Silva (3-9) || || 30,965 ||26-49
|- align="center" bgcolor="bbffbb"
| 76 || June 23 || @ Mets || 5 – 2  ||Rowland-Smith (2-1) || Santana (7-6) ||Rhodes (1) || 49,789 ||27-49
|- align="center" bgcolor="bbffbb" 
| 77 || June 24 || @ Mets || 11 – 0 || Dickey (2-3) || Pérez (5-5) || || 49,386 || 28-49
|- align="center" bgcolor="ffbbbb"
| 78 || June 25 || @ Mets || 8 – 2 || Maine (8-5) || Batista (3-10) || || 52,154 || 28-50
|- align="center" bgcolor="bbffbb"
| 79 || June 27 || @ Padres || 5 – 2 || Washburn (3-7) || Wolf (5-7) || Morrow (3) || 28,640 || 29-50
|- align="center" bgcolor="bbffbb"
| 80 || June 28 || @ Padres || 4 – 2 || Silva (4-9) ||Baek (1–4) || Morrow (4) || 36,396 || 30-50
|- align="center" bgcolor="bbffbb"
| 81 || June 29 || @ Padres || 9 – 2 || Bédard (5-4) || Peavy (5-5) || || 29,966 || 31-50
|- align="center" bgcolor="ffbbbb"
| 82 || June 30 || Blue Jays || 2 – 0 || Halladay (9-6) || Dickey (2-4) || || 30,179 || 31-51
|-

|- align="center" bgcolor="bbffbb"
| 83 || July 1 || Blue Jays || 7 – 6 || Morrow (1-1) || Downs (0-2) || || 24,586 || 32-51
|- align="center" bgcolor="bbffbb"
| 84 || July 2 || Blue Jays || 4 – 2 || Washburn (4-7) || McGowan (6-7) || Morrow (5) || 23,283 || 33-51
|- align="center" bgcolor="ffbbbb"
| 85 || July 3 || Tigers || 8 – 4 || Verlander (5–9) || Silva (4–10) || Rodney (1) || 22,523 || 33-52
|- align="center" bgcolor="bbffbb"
| 86 || July 4 || Tigers || 4 – 1 || Bédard (6-4) || Rogers (6–6) || Morrow (6) || 30,564 || 34-52
|- align="center" bgcolor="bbffbb"
| 87 || July 5 || Tigers || 3 – 2 || Batista (4-10) || Rodney (0-2) || Morrow (7) || 30,373 || 35-52
|- align="center" bgcolor="ffbbbb"
| 88 || July 6 || Tigers || 2 – 1 (15)|| López (3–1) || Burke (0-1) || Jones (16) || 29,083 || 35-53
|- align="center" bgcolor="ffbbbb"
| 89 || July 7 || @ Athletics || 4 – 3 || Eveland (7-5) || Washburn (4-8) || Street (17) || 11,129 || 35-54
|- align="center" bgcolor="ffbbbb"
| 90 || July 8 || @ Athletics || 2 – 0 || Duchscherer (10-5) || Silva (4-11) || || 12,543 || 35-55
|- align="center" bgcolor="bbffbb"
| 91 || July 9 || @ Athletics || 6 – 4 || Corcoran (1-0) || Blanton (5-12) || Morrow (8) || 21,128 || 36-55
|- align="center" bgcolor="ffbbbb"
| 92 || July 10 || @ Athletics || 3 – 2 (11) || Street (2-2) || Jiménez (0-1) || || 15,187 || 36-56
|- align="center" bgcolor="ffbbbb"
| 93 || July 11 || @ Royals || 3 – 1 || Hochevar (6-7) || Hernández (6-6) || Soria (25) || 25,345 || 36-57
|- align="center" bgcolor="ffbbbb"
| 94 || July 12 || @ Royals || 5 – 4 || Ramírez (1-0) || Morrow (1-2) || || 23,792 || 36-58
|- align="center" bgcolor="bbffbb"
| 95 || July 13 || @ Royals || 4 – 3 || Green (2-2) || Soria (1-2) || Morrow (9) || 21,421 || 37-58
|- align="center"  bgcolor="bbffbb"
| 96 || July 18 || Indians || 8 – 2 || Hernández (7-6) || Laffey (5-6) ||  || 42,570 || 38-58
|- align="center" bgcolor="ffbbbb"
| 97 || July 19 || Indians || 9 – 6 || Sowers (1-5) || Batista (4-11) || || 37,869 || 38-59
|- align="center" bgcolor="ffbbbb"
| 98 || July 20 || Indians || 6 – 2 || Lee (13-2) || Silva (4–12) || || 32,230 || 38-60
|- align="center" bgcolor="ffbbbb" 
| 99 || July 21 || Red Sox || 4 – 0 || Lester (8-3) || Washburn (4-9) || Papelbon (29) || 37,861 || 38-61
|- align="center" bgcolor="ffbbbb"
| 100 || July 22 || Red Sox || 4 – 2 || Matsuzaka (11-1) || Dickey (2-5) || Papelbon (30) || 38,425 || 38-62
|- align="center" bgcolor="ffbbbb"
| 101 || July 23 || Red Sox || 6 – 3 || Papelbon (4-3) || Green (2-3) || Hansen (2) || 43,231 || 38-63
|- align="center" bgcolor="ffbbbb"
| 102 || July 25 || @ Blue Jays || 5 – 4 (10) || Carlson (3-1) || Lowe (1-4) || || 28,463 || 38-64
|- align="center" bgcolor="ffbbbb"
| 103 || July 26 || @ Blue Jays || 8 – 3 || Purcey (1-1) || Dickey (2-6) || || 33,041 || 38-65
|- align="center" bgcolor="bbffbb"
| 104 || July 27 || @ Blue Jays || 5 – 1 || Washburn (5-9) || Marcum (5-5) || || 33,367 || 39-65
|- align="center" bgcolor="bbffbb"
| 105 || July 28 || @ Rangers || 7 – 5 || Green (3-3) || Francisco (2-3) || Morrow (10) || 21,742 || 40-65
|- align="center" bgcolor="ffbbbb"
| 106 || July 29 || @ Rangers || 11 – 10 || Wilson (1-2) || Putz (2-4) || || 17,618 || 40-66
|- align="center" bgcolor="ffbbbb"
| 107 || July 30 || @ Rangers || 4 – 3 || Guardado (2-2) || Rhodes (2-1) || Wilson (24) || 23,894 || 40-67
|- align="center" bgcolor="bbffbb"
| 108 || July 31 || @ Rangers || 8 – 5 || Dickey (3-6) || Harrison (2-2) ||  || 17,839 || 41-67
|-

|- align="center" bgcolor="ffbbbb"
| 109 || August 1 || Orioles || 10 – 5 || Olson (8-5) || Washburn (5-10) || || 28,114 || 41-68
|- align="center" bgcolor="ffbbbb"
| 110 || August 2 || Orioles || 3 – 1 || Guthrie (8-8) || Hernández (7-7) || || 30,502 || 41-69
|- align="center" bgcolor="bbffbb"
| 111 || August 3 || Orioles || 8 – 4 || Putz (3-4) || Cabrera (7-7) || || 33,334 || 42-69
|- align="center" bgcolor="bbffbb"
| 112 || August 4 || Twins || 11 – 6 || Corcoran (2-0) || Bass (3-4) || || 27,758 || 43-69
|- align="center" bgcolor="bbffbb"
| 113 || August 5 || Twins || 8 – 7 || J. J. Putz (4-4) || Guerrier (6-5) || || 26,083 || 44-69
|- align="center" bgcolor="ffbbbb"
| 114 || August 6 || Twins || 7 – 3 || Blackburn (9-6) || Washburn (5-11) || || 30,441 || 44-70
|- align="center" bgcolor="bbffbb"
| 115 || August 7 || Rays || 2 – 1 || Putz (5-4) || Wheeler (2-5) || || 25,423 || 45-70
|- align="center" bgcolor="ffbbbb"
| 116 || August 8 || Rays || 5 – 3 || Shields (10-7) || Silva (4-13) || Percival (25) || 30,220 || 45-71
|- align="center" bgcolor="ffbbbb"
| 117 || August 9 || Rays || 8 – 7 (11) || Bradford (4-3) || Batista (4-12) || Percival (26) || 27,905 || 45-72
|- align="center" bgcolor="ffbbbb"
| 118 || August 10 || Rays || 11 – 3 || Jackson (9-7) || Dickey (3-7) || || 30,336 || 45-73
|- align="center" bgcolor="ffbbbb"
| 119 || August 12 || @ Angels || 7-3 || Garland (11-7) || Washburn (5-12) || Rodríguez (46) || 42,086 || 45-74
|- align="center" bgcolor="bbffbb"
| 120 || August 13 || @ Angels || 10 – 7 (12) || Corcoran (3-0) || Speier (1-5) || || 42,754 || 46-74
|- align="center" bgcolor="ffbbbb"
| 121 || August 15 || @ Twins || 9-3 || Liriano (3-3) || Silva (4-14) || || 32,208 || 46-75
|- align="center" bgcolor="ffbbbb"
| 122 || August 16 || @ Twins || 7-6 || Reyes (3-0) || Jimenez (0-3) || || 36,316 || 46-76
|- align="center" bgcolor="ffbbbb"
| 123 || August 17 || @ Twins || 11-8 || Perkins (10-3) || Feierabend (0-1) || Nathan (33) || 35,478 || 46-77
|- align="center" bgcolor="ffbbbb"
| 124 || August 18 || @ White Sox || 13-5 || Buehrle (11-10) || Washburn (5-13) || || 39,002 || 46-78
|- align="center" bgcolor="ffbbbb"
| 125 || August 19 || @ White Sox || 5-0 || Richard (1-2) || Hernández (7-8) || || 26,414 || 46-79
|- align="center" bgcolor="ffbbbb"
| 126 || August 20 || @ White Sox || 15-3 || Floyd (13-6) || Dickey (3-8) || || 27,000 || 46-80
|- align="center" bgcolor="ffbbbb"
| 127 || August 21 || Athletics || 2-0 || Smith (6-12) || Rowland-Smith (2-2) || Ziegler (4) || 25,611 || 46-81
|- align="center" bgcolor="bbffbb"
| 128 || August 22 || Athletics || 7-5 || Corcoran (4-0) || Blevins (1-3) || Putz (8) || 26,603 || 47-81
|- align="center" bgcolor="ffbbbb"
| 129 || August 23 || Athletics || 5 – 1 || Eveland (8-8) || Washburn (5-14) || || 34,145 || 47-82
|- align="center" bgcolor="bbffbb"
| 130 || August 24 || Athletics || 8 – 4 || Hernández (8-8) || Meyer (0-2) || Putz (9) || 28,731 || 48-82
|- align="center" bgcolor="bbffbb"
| 131 || August 25 || Twins || 4 – 2 (11) || Dickey (4-8) || Crain (5-4) || || 23,277 || 49-82
|- align="center" bgcolor="bbffbb"
| 132 || August 26 || Twins || 3 – 2 || Rowland-Smith (3-2) || Baker (7-4) || Corcoran (1) || 26,292 || 50-82
|- align="center" bgcolor="ffbbbb"
| 133 || August 27 || Twins || 6 – 5 || Perkins (12-3) || Green (3-4) || Nathan (36) || 23,581 || 50-83
|- align="center" bgcolor="bbffbb"
| 134 || August 29 || @ Indians || 3 – 2 || Hernández (9-8) || Sowers (2-7) || Putz (10) || 26,047 || 51-83
|- align="center" bgcolor="bbffbb"
| 135 || August 30 || @ Indians || 4 – 3 (10) || Putz (6-4) || Lewis (0-4) || Messenger (1) || 33,387 || 52-83
|- align="center" bgcolor="bbffbb"
| 136 || August 31 || @ Indians || 6 – 4 || Rowland-Smith (4-2) || Jackson (0-1) || Corcoran (2) || 35,376 || 53-83
|-

|- align="center" bgcolor="bbffbb"
| 137 || September 1 || @ Rangers || 12 – 6 || Green (4-4) || Mendoza (3-7) || || 16,171 || 54-83
|- align="center" bgcolor="ffbbbb"
| 138 || September 2 || @ Rangers || 6 – 4 || McCarthy (1-0) || Feierabend (0-2) || Francisco (3) || 14,521 || 54-84
|- align="center" bgcolor="ffbbbb"
| 139 || September 3 || @ Rangers || 1 – 0 || Nippert (2-4) || Hernández (9-9) || Francisco (4) || 12,882 || 54-85
|- align="center" bgcolor="bbffbb"
| 140 || September 5 || Yankees || 3 – 1 || Morrow (2-2) || Pettitte (13-12) || Putz (11) || 39,518 || 55-85
|- align="center" bgcolor="ffbbbb"
| 141 || September 6 || Yankees || 7 – 4 || Ponson (8-5) || Green (4-5) || Rivera (33) || 44,473 || 55-86
|- align="center" bgcolor="bbffbb"
| 142 || September 7 || Yankees || 5 – 2 || Feierabend (1-2) || Mussina (17-8) || Putz (12) || 42,677 || 56-86
|- align="center" bgcolor="ffbbbb"
| 143 || September 9 || Rangers || 7 – 3 || Padilla (13-7) || Hernández (9-10) || Madrigal (1) || 22,704 || 56-87
|- align="center" bgcolor="bbffbb"
| 144 || September 10 || Rangers || 8-7 || Corcoran (5-0) || Millwood (9-9) || Putz (13) || 23,644 || 57-87
|- align="center" bgcolor="ffbbbb"
| 145 || September 11 || @ Angels || 7 – 4 || Weaver (11-10) || Morrow (2-3) || Rodríguez (57) || 38,205 || 57-88
|- align="center" bgcolor="ffbbbb"
| 146 || September 12 || @ Angels || 5 – 3 || Arredondo (8-2) || Batista (4-13) || || 43,743 || 57-89
|- align="center" bgcolor="ffbbbb"
| 147 || September 13 || @ Angels || 5 – 2 || Garland (14-8) || Feierabend (1-3) || Rodríguez (58) || 43,757 || 57-90
|- align="center" bgcolor="ffbbbb"
| 148 || September 14 || @ Angels || 4 – 3 || Arredondo (9-2) || Corcoran (5-1) || || 41,528 || 57-91
|- align="center" bgcolor="ffbbbb"
| 149 || September 15 || @ Royals || 3 – 0 || Davies (7-7) || Silva (4-15)  || Soria (38) || 10,307 || 57-92
|- align="center" bgcolor="ffbbbb"
| 150 || September 16 || @ Royals || 6 – 3 || Duckworth (3-1) || Morrow (2-4) || Soria (39) || 19,135 || 57-93
|- align="center" bgcolor="ffbbbb"
| 151 || September 17 || @ Royals || 5 – 2 || Meche (12-11) || Corcoran (5-2) || Soria (40) || 13,382 || 57-94
|- align="center" bgcolor="ffbbbb"
| 152 || September 18 || @ Royals || 12 – 0 || Greinke (12-10) || Feierabend (1-4) || || 14,144 || 57-95
|- align="center" bgcolor="ffbbbb"
| 153 || September 19 || @ Athletics || 2 – 0 || Eveland (9-8) || Hernández (9-11) || Ziegler (10) || 30,149 || 57-96
|- align="center" bgcolor="ffbbbb"
| 154 || September 20 || @ Athletics || 8 – 7 || Street (7-5) || Thomas (0-1) || Ziegler (11) || 18,756 || 57-97
|- align="center" bgcolor="ffbbbb"
| 155 || September 21 || @ Athletics || 5 – 3 || Ziegler (3-0) || Batista (4-14) || Devine (1) || 18,707 || 57-98
|- align="center" bgcolor="ffbbbb"
| 156 || September 22 || Angels || 2 – 1 || Santana (16-6) || Rowland-Smith (4-3) || Rodríguez (61) || 19,717 || 57-99
|- align="center" bgcolor="bbffbb"
| 157 || September 23 || Angels || 9 – 6 || Corcoran (6-2) || Jepsen (0-1) || Putz (14) || 19,065 || 58-99
|- align="center" bgcolor="ffbbbb"
| 158 || September 24 || Angels || 6 – 5 || Oliver (7-1) || Lowe (1-5) || Rodríguez (62) || 19,015 || 58-100
|- align="center" bgcolor="ffbbbb"
| 159 || September 25 || Angels || 6 – 4 || Arredondo (10-2) || Putz (6-5) || Shields (4) || 16,939 || 58-101
|- align="center" bgcolor="bbffbb"
| 160 || September 26 || Athletics || 10 – 8 || Morrow (3-4) || Gallagher (2-3) || Corcoran (3) || 24,662 || 59-101
|- align="center" bgcolor="bbffbb"
| 161 || September 27 || Athletics || 7 – 3 || Rowland-Smith (5-3) || Smith (7-16) || Green (1) || 24,440 || 60-101
|- align="center" bgcolor="bbffbb"
| 162 || September 28 || Athletics ||4 – 3 ||R. A. Dickey (5-8) ||Outman (0-1) || J. J. Putz (15) || 25,000 (approx.) || 61-101
|-

Player stats

Batting
Note: G = Games played; AB = At bats; H = Hits; Avg. = Batting average; HR = Home runs; RBI = Runs Batted In

Pitching

Starting pitchers
Note: G = Games pitched; IP = Innings pitched; W = Wins; L = Losses; ERA = Earned run average; SO = Strikeouts

Relief pitchers
Note: G = Games pitched; IP = Innings pitched; SV = Saves; W = Wins; L = Losses; H = Holds; ERA = Earned run average; SO = Strikeouts

Farm system

Major League Baseball Draft 

Below is a complete list of the Seattle Mariners draft picks from the two 2008 Major League Baseball drafts.

The 2008 Major League Baseball Draft was held on June 5 and June 6, 2008. He Mariners made the 20th selection in the draft, selecting Joshua Fields. The Mariners selected a total of 50 players and signed 36 of those selected players.

In the 2008 Rule 5 draft the Mariners selected two players, one in the Major League phase and one in the Triple-A phase. They also had three players selected by other teams, two in the Triple-A phase and one in the Double-A phase.

June amateur draft

Key

Table

Rule 5 draft

Key

Table

References

Game Logs:
1st Half: Seattle Mariners Game Log on ESPN.com
2nd Half: Seattle Mariners Game Log on ESPN.com
Batting Statistics: Seattle Mariners Batting Stats on ESPN.com
Pitching Statistics: Seattle Mariners Pitching Stats on ESPN.com
2008 Seattle Mariners season at Baseball Reference
2008 Seattle Mariners team page at www.baseball-almanac.com
Seattle Mariners Team page at www.mlb.com 

Seattle Mariners seasons
Seattle Mariners season
2008 in sports in Washington (state)